Aaron Black (born 19 December 1983) is a Northern Irish former professional footballer.

Biography
Aaron started his career at Ayr United. After being released he was due to join Inverness Caledonian Thistle, until financial difficulties arose causing the deal to fall through.
Aaron then turned his sights to foreign fields and with the help of ex-Rangers player and Trinidadian international Russell Latapy a deal was sealed with the island's top team, W Connection.

In 2005, he returned to Northern Ireland to play for Glenavon and Larne, before moving to Crusaders where he was a member of the Irish Cup winning team of 2009, scoring one of the goals in the semi-final against Institute. On 5 May 2010, Aaron signed a two-year deal with Coleraine.

After an injury ravaged year, he signed for local rivals Ballymena United. He played one game for the Braidmen, in which he was sent off in the 49th minute against old club Glenavon. He never played for the club again and was released shortly after.

Honours
Crusaders
Irish Cup (1): 2008–09
County Antrim Shield (1): 2009–10

References

Living people
1983 births
People from Larne
Association footballers from Northern Ireland
Association football midfielders
Crusaders F.C. players
Coleraine F.C. players
NIFL Premiership players
Ayr United F.C. players
W Connection F.C. players
Glenavon F.C. players
Larne F.C. players
Ballymena United F.C. players
Sportspeople from County Antrim